Calosoma chlorostictum is a species of ground beetle in the subfamily of Carabinae. It was described by Dejean in 1831.

References

chlorostictum
Beetles described in 1831